Zahra Pinto (born November 14, 1993) is a Malawian swimmer, who specialized in sprint freestyle events. Pinto represented Malawi at the 2008 Summer Olympics in Beijing, where she swam in the second heat of the women's 50 m freestyle event. She finished the race in third place, with a time of 32.53 seconds. Pinto, however, failed to advance into the semi-finals, as she placed eighty-second in the overall rankings.

Currently, she is a coach at Thanyapura Sports and Leisure club, Phuket.

Pinto is the president of Malsoc (Malawi Society) for the year of 2016 at Rhodes University.

References

External links
NBC 2008 Olympics profile

1993 births
Living people
Malawian female swimmers
Olympic swimmers of Malawi
Swimmers at the 2008 Summer Olympics
Swimmers at the 2016 Summer Olympics
Malawian female freestyle swimmers
Swimmers at the 2010 Summer Youth Olympics
Swimmers at the 2010 Commonwealth Games
Commonwealth Games competitors for Malawi